Tewelde Goitom, or Walid or Welid, is an Eritrean human trafficker and smuggler.

Between 2014 and 2018, he was "at the heart of a particularly brutal and lucrative trade in desperate migrants trying to reach Europe". 
He was arrested in March 2020, tried and found guilty.

References 

Year of birth missing (living people)
Living people